Joëlle Guillais ( Maury; 10 August 1952 – 19 November 2022) was a French writer.

Biography
Originally from Alençon, Guillais earned a doctoral degree in history. In 1988, she published La Berthe with Plon, which was described by Michelle Perrot in Libération as "an ethnological document of exceptional quality, as well as a story of great intensity". In 1997, she published the story Agnès E, which sought to give visibility to women's prisons at a time when little attention was given to the affairs of prisoners. In 2008, she wrote and published La pesticide, an avant-garde dystopian novel which covered the dangerous effect of pesticides on human health, for which she received harassment from farmers following its publication.

Guillais directed "Mot A Mot" writing workshops in Paris and Saint-Cyr-la-Rosière. She collaborated with Laurence Verdier to publish a collection of 23 short stories titled 23 mecs comme ça, which reflected male-female relations in contemporary society. In 2019, she published Matins de fer, a novel inspired by the death of three young Romanis in a traffic collision on the A7 autoroute in La Castellane. She worked as a portrait painter for the magazine Pays du Perche after having written several columns for the HuffPost.

Guillais died following a stroke in Caen, on 19 November 2022, at the age of 70.

Publications
Les grisettes ou l’imaginaire amoureux au 19e siècle (1985)
La Chair de l'autre : le crime passionnel au XIXe siècle (1986)
La Berthe (1991)
Agnès E. (1997)
La ferme des orages (1999)
Les Champs de la colère : roman (1999)
La Prime aux loups (2000)
La Teinturerie (2002)
Barbie Rousse, sujet tabou (2003)
Les chemins des mots (2004)
Les causeuses d'Hérouville (2005)
Mauvaises nouvelles littéraires (2006)
La Pesticide (2008)
23 Mecs comme ça (2017)
Matins de fer (2019)

References

1952 births
2022 deaths
20th-century French women writers
21st-century French women writers
People from Alençon